Project Child or Project “CHILD”, an initiative of Society for Promotion of School Health (SPSH), is the oldest and most comprehensive School Health Programme of Assam. It incorporates the emergency, preventive, promotive and curative aspect of School Health Care, as well as, addressing all the needs of a school student.

‘CHILD’ is an acronym for "Child Health Intellectual and Lifestyle Development". The project is an initiative of a group of more than 40 doctors under the banner of Society for Promotion of School Health and Lifestyle Consultancy (SPSH) and has been active since 2008. To date, this project has covered the life of roughly  3, 10,000 students in Assam; of these, around 10,000 students are from Guwahati city.

Schools Covered 
The following are schools covered under this initiative:
 Faculty Higher Secondary School
 Don Bosco High School, Guwahati
 Maria's Public School
 Assam Don Bosco University
 Pragjyotish Sr. Secondary School
 Pragjyotish School
 Faculty School
 Faculty School
 Shirdi Sai Vidya Mandir
 Maria Montessori School
 Modern English School
 Delhi Public School
 South Point School
 St. Francis De Sales School
 Gurukul Grammar Senior Secondary School
 Holy Child School
 Gyan Educational Institution
 Sanskriti Gurukul

References 

Education in Assam